Ryszard Jan Świlski (born 4 January 1971) is a Polish politician. He was elected to the Senate of Poland (10th term) representing the constituency of Gdańsk.

References 

Living people
1971 births
Place of birth missing (living people)
20th-century Polish politicians
21st-century Polish politicians
Members of the Senate of Poland 2019–2023